, also known as ,  or  in Lombardy, is a common Italian breakfast item dating back to rustic times. Similar to zabaione, uovo sbattuto consists of egg yolk and sugar, ingredients readily available in most villages and farms.

In olden times it was considered an easy way to consume a quick and economical breakfast. Often espresso and milk can be added to make . This is usually eaten with crusty or toasted bread. When made for children, caffè d'orzo (a caffeine-free grain drink) can be substituted for the espresso.

See also
Espresso
Zabaione

References

Sources
 Zabaglione al Caffé Recipe on Food52

Italian desserts
Egg dishes